Velian may refer to:
Velian, Alborz, a village in Alborz Province, Iran
Velian Hill, a hill of Rome
Operation: Matriarchy, a computer game